William Raisbeck (22 December 1875 – 2 November 1946) was a Scottish professional association football player at the turn of the twentieth century.

Career 
Born in Wallacestone, Stirlingshire but raised in a mining community near Cambuslang in South Lanarkshire, Raisbeck began his career with Larkhall Thistle before going on to Hibernian (no league appearances) and Clyde. In 1896 he travelled south of the border to join Sunderland, but left without playing a match and returned to Scotland, where he played for Royal Albert and once again for Clyde, where he did play in several league matches.

In 1898 he joined Sunderland again, and this time made 69 appearances in the English Football League, scoring five goals. In 1901 he joined Derby County, but made only three appearances.

In 1902 he joined New Brompton of the Southern League, where he played for two seasons, making over 60 appearances. In 1904 he played for Reading, after which he returned to Scotland to play for Falkirk for the next two seasons.

Personal life 
In 1907, Raisbeck and other members of his family, including his younger brother Andrew who was also a footballer (Hibernian, Hull City), emigrated to Canada. He died in Alberta in 1946.

He was also the older brother of Scottish international footballer Alex Raisbeck (Hibernian, Liverpool, Partick Thistle, Scotland). A cousin of the family, Luke Raisbeck, played for West Ham United and Blackpool among others.

References

1875 births
1946 deaths
Scottish footballers
Association football wing halves
Footballers from Falkirk (council area)
Gillingham F.C. players
Hibernian F.C. players
Clyde F.C. players
Sunderland A.F.C. players
Derby County F.C. players
Larkhall Thistle F.C. players
Falkirk F.C. players
Scottish Junior Football Association players
English Football League players
Scottish Football League players
Southern Football League players
Royal Albert F.C. players
Scottish emigrants to Canada
People from Polmont
Sportspeople from Cambuslang
Footballers from South Lanarkshire